Amadin or ‘Emad ad-Dīn was a 13th-century Yazidi saint.

Family tree
Amadin was one of the nine sons of Sheikh Shems. He is associated with healing stomach pains.

References

13th-century births
13th-century deaths
13th-century Kurdish people
Yazidi holy figures